Pontastacus leptodactylus, the Danube crayfish, Galician crayfish, Turkish crayfish or narrow-clawed crayfish is a species of brackish water crayfish imported and introduced to Central Europe in 19th century from the Caspian Sea region.

Description
The sides of the thorax are very rough, usually pale yellow to pale green in colour. P. leptodactylus has two pairs of post-orbital ridges, the second of which may have spines. It also has a prominent tubercle (small nodule) on shoulder of the carapace. The claws of Pontastacus leptodactylus are long and narrow (hence the common name 'narrow-clawed crayfish'). Their upper surface is rough and the underside is the same colour as the body. A tubercle can be found on the fixed side of the claw. P. leptodactylus can be distinguished most easily from the European or broad-fingered crayfish, Astacus astacus, by the relatively thinner "fingers" of the claws. Further studies done on the Pontastacus leptodactylus found that they can be co-infected by two or more different pathogens. A study done by R. Salighehzadeh saw that after collecting 10 narrow-clawed crayfish found that they contained 2 pathogenic isolates simultaneously, the Aeromonas hydrophilia and Fusarium solani.

Ecology
Pontastacus leptodactylus is fairly docile, especially the male with large claws, and favours relatively still brackish waters such as lakes and canals. It is listed as a species of Least Concern on the IUCN Red List.

References

External links

Astacidae
Freshwater crustaceans of Europe
Fauna of the Caspian Sea
Crustaceans described in 1823
Taxobox binomials not recognized by IUCN